Revolutionary defeatism is a concept made most prominent by Vladimir Lenin in World War I. It is based on the Marxist idea of class struggle. Arguing that the proletariat could not win or gain when fighting a war under capitalism, Lenin declared its true enemy is the imperialist leaders who sent their lower classes into battle. Workers would gain more from their own nations' defeats, he argued, if the war could be turned into civil war and then international revolution.

Initially rejected by all but the more radical at the socialist Zimmerwald Conference in 1915, the concept appears to have gained support from more and more socialists, especially in Russia in 1917 after it was forcefully reaffirmed in Lenin's "April Theses" as Russia's war losses continued, even after the February Revolution as the Provisional Government kept them in the conflict. Revolutionary defeatism was also a policy of the International Communist Party under Amadeo Bordiga, which saw World War II as a reactionary war between two opposing empires, in contrast to the propaganda of the Allied Bourgeoisie, which treated the war as a progressive fight for freedom and liberation from the Nazi regime. During World War I in the United Kingdom, the British socialist movement included a small minority of revolutionary defeatists such as John Maclean.

Using Lenin's terminology, revolutionary defeatism can be contrasted to revolutionary defencism and to social patriotism or social chauvinism.

See also 
 Proletarian internationalism
 No War but the Class War

References 

Communist terminology
Russian Revolution